Ballad of the Masterthief Ole Hoiland is a 1970 Norwegian drama film directed by Knut Andersen, and starring a broad cast of notable Norwegian actors, headed by Per Jansen as Ole Høiland. Ole Høiland was an actual Norwegian Robin Hood-figure in the early 19th century. He steals from the rich and gives to the poor, enjoying numerous affairs with attractive women along the way. The story culminates in the ambitious burglary of Norges Bank, Norway's central bank.

External links
 
 Balladen om mestertyven Ole Høiland at Filmweb.no (Norwegian)

1970 films
1970 drama films
Films directed by Knut Andersen
Norwegian drama films